Bau is an album by Italian singer Mina, issued in 2006.

Track listing 
 "Mogol Battisti" - 4:04
 "Sull'Orient Express" - 3:48
 "Johnny scarpe gialle" - 4:54
 "Nessun altro mai" - 4:32
 "Alibi" - 3:42
 "Per poco che sia" - 3:29
 "The End" - 3:47
 "Un uomo che mi ama" - 6:18
 "L'amore viene e se ne va" - 4:35
 "Fai la tua vita" - 5:05
 "Inevitabile" - 4:48
 "Come te lo devo dire" - 4:50
 "Datemi della musica" - 5:38

Charts

Certifications

Musicians
Arrangements
 Ugo Bongianni - arrangements (tracks 3, 8, 10, 11, 12, 13
 Nicolò Fragile - arrangements (tracks 1)
 Massimiliano Pani - arrangements tracks 2, 4, 5, 6, 7, 9)

Musicians
 Mina - vocals
 Ugo Bongianni - keyboards
 Danilo Rea - piano
 Faso, Lorenzo Poli - bass
 Lele Melotti - percussion
 Vincenzo Bramanti, Luca Meneghello - guitar
 Gabriele Comeglio - aerophone arrangements, flutes and clarinet
 Emilio Soana, Pippo Colucci, Umberto Mercandalli - trumpet
 Mauro Parodi, Angelo Rolando - trombones
 Paolo Barbieri, Gabriele Comeglio - saxophone
 Emilio Soana - flugelhorn
 Andrea Mingardi - vocals ("Mogol Battisti", "Datemi della musica")
 Giulia Fasolino, Antonio Galbiati, Stefania Martin, Massimiliano Pani - backing vocals

References

2006 albums
Mina (Italian singer) albums